"Hometown Honeymoon" is a song written by Josh Leo and Jim Photoglo, and recorded by American country music group Alabama.  It was released in March 1993 as the fourth and final single from their album, American Pride.  The song reached number 3 on the Billboard Hot Country Singles & Tracks chart in June 1993.

Chart performance

Year-end charts

References

1993 singles
Alabama (American band) songs
Songs written by Josh Leo
Song recordings produced by Josh Leo
RCA Records Nashville singles
Songs written by Jim Photoglo
1992 songs